A kip-up (also called a rising handspring, Chinese get up, kick-up, kick-to-stand, nip-up, flip-up, or carp skip-up) is an acrobatic move in which a person transitions from a supine, and less commonly, a prone position, to a standing position. It is used in activities such as breakdancing, gymnastics, martial arts (specifically kung fu), professional wrestling, and freerunning, and in action film fight sequences.

Not only does the kip-up require muscle activation and strength, but it also requires proper technique for successful completion. A practitioner must perform the preparation phase (initiation of movement until directly before flight), aerial phase (time spent in flight), and landing phase (time from touchdown of the feet to maintenance of balanced standing) using specific accelerations, angular velocities, and joint positions of the extremities in order to land on their feet.

Execution and physics

From a supine position

The performer draws both legs (which may be either in extension or flexion) anterior to the chest, rotates back onto the shoulders, and optionally places hands on the floor proximal to the ears. The performer then moves from hip and knee flexion to hip and knee extension while elevating the body away from the floor. The performer creates force against the ground by pushing off with the hands and simultaneously moving the elbows from flexion to extension.

The leg motion during the thrust involves increasing the joint angle of the hip from flexion to extension. When the thrust is completed, the rotation of the legs with respect to the trunk is terminated and, as a result, the angular momentum of the legs is transferred to the entire body. The linear momentum of the thrust carries the body into the air feet first while the angular momentum causes the airborne body to rotate. The spine moves into greater lordosis so that with sufficient thrust, back curvature, and body rotation, the performer will land on the feet.

From prone position
With body face-down, the performer creates forces against the floor with fists or palms while kicking back the legs so as to develop momentum that carries the body into the air. The performer lands with the feet in contact with the floor, and knees in flexion.

Variations

Hop back variations
Hop back variations all involve the practitioner starting in a standing position, possibly jumping in the air and rotating posterior in order to land on their shoulders/back. After maintaining the supine position the practitioner executes the standard kip up variation in order to return to their feet.

See also
Kip (artistic gymnastics)
Kip (trampolining)

Breakdance moves
Gymnastics elements
Martial art techniques